Wollongong Olympic Football Club, often referred to as "Olympic" are semi-professional association football team based in North Wollongong, New South Wales. They compete in the Illawarra Premier League. The club was formed during the 20th century, initially called "Aris FC" and then renamed "Wollongong Olympic FC" in 1990. The club has won the Illawarra Premier League Premiership on two occasions in 1994 and 2019 and the Grand Final on one occasion in 1985 (then called Aris FC). They play out of Herb Clunis Oval which is in the North Wollongong branch of the PCYC.

Honours
 Illawarra Premier League First Grade
 
 Minor Premierships (2) 1994, 2019

Premierships (Grand Final) (2) 1985, 2022

Bert Bampton Cup Winners (3) 1986, 2016, 2018

Grand Finalists (4) 1993, 1994, 2000, 2019
 

 Illawarra Premier League Youth Grade

Premierships (1) 1991

Grand Final Wins (2) 1990, 1991

Awards 
Illawarra Premier League Player Of The Year 
 Peter Kotamanidis (1997), Yuseke Ueda (2018)
Premier League Leading Goal Scorer
 Yuseke Ueda (2018)

Notable players and Coaches

 John Fleming, Peter Kotamanidis, Abbas Saad, Peter Zorbas, Stuart_Young_(footballer), Chris Jackson, Yusuke Ueda, George Antoniou, Anthony Guido, Micky Atsas, Josh_Macdonald
Soccer clubs in Wollongong
Illawarra Premier League